The Diesel & Electric Loco Shed, Krishnarajapuram is a motive power depot performing locomotive maintenance and repair facility for diesel locomotives and electric locomotives of the Indian Railways, located at Krishnarajapuram (KJM) of the South Western Railway zone in the city of Bangalore, Karnataka. It is one of two diesel loco sheds and only electric loco sheds of the South Western Railway, the other being at Hubli.

Diesel Locomotives

Electric Locomotives

References

External links 

Diesel Shed (Krishnarajapuram) South Western Railway
Sheds and Workshops IRFCA

South Western Railway zone
1981 establishments in Karnataka
Rail transport in Karnataka
Buildings and structures in Bangalore
Transport infrastructure completed in 1981